Ferdinand Victorin Barrot (10 January 1806 – 12 November 1883) was a French Bonapartist politician who carried the portfolio of Interior Minister of France, 31 October 1849 to 15 March 1850.

Biography
Born in Paris, the son of Jean-André Barrot, and thus the brother of Odilon Barrot and Adolphe Barrot, Ferdinand Barrot pursued law studies and became an avocat under the Restoration. Following the Revolution of 1830 he served for a time as an assistant procurator at the civil tribunal of the département of the Seine, but quit the magistrature after some time to return to the bar, where he pleaded several politically charged cases, notably that of Colonel Vaudrey implicated in the attempted insurrection at Strasbourg fomented by prince Louis-Napoléon Bonaparte, in which he obtained acquittal, 18 January 1837. He pleaded also in the case of the republican activist Armand Barbès (1839).

He was elected a deputy by the third electoral college of Indre-et-Loire, 9 July 1842, and allied himself at first with the centre-left. He was appointed avocat for the Ministry of the Treasury. With his re-election 1 August 1846 he found himself preoccupied with Algerian affairs; accordingly when  were granted Algeria he was elected to represent the new département of Algeria, 18 June 1848. Having failed to be returned 23 May 1849, he was elected for the département of the Seine in a by-election to fill vacated seats, 8 July 1849.

He voted generally in the revolutionary year of 1848 with the right: against clubs and associations (18 June 1848), but with the Left against re-establishing press controls (9 August); with the prosecution against Louis Blanc and Caussidière (26 August); against the Pyat amendment concerning right to work (2 November); for the French expedition to Rome (30 November); against the suppression of the salt tax (27 December).

In 1849 he voted for the return to the High Court of those accused 15 May 1848 (22 January 1849); again for the interdiction of clubs (21 March); against the accusation of the Président Napoleon and his ministers (11 May).

Allied with prince Louis-Napoléon Bonaparte, whom he had assisted before the Camber of Peers after the Boulogne affair (1840), he associated himself with Napoleon's party and was named secrétaire de la Présidence (1849), Minister of the Interior (31 October 1849), and ambassador to Turin upon leaving the ministry in March 1850. He was a member of the consultative commission following the coup d'état of 2 December 1851. He was made a senator under the Second Empire (4 March 1853) and a Grand Officer of the Légion d'honneur (12 August 1857).

With the collapse of the Second Empire, Barrot returned to private life. He ran unsuccessfully for a seat under the Third Republic, 16 May 1877 but was defeated, in spite of the support of MacMahon. He was seated in the Senate, as a bonapartist, 4 December 1877.

He died in Paris, 12 November 1883.

References

1806 births
1883 deaths
Politicians from Paris
Party of Order politicians
Bonapartists
French interior ministers
Members of the 6th Chamber of Deputies of the July Monarchy
Members of the 7th Chamber of Deputies of the July Monarchy
Members of the 1848 Constituent Assembly
Members of the National Legislative Assembly of the French Second Republic
French Senators of the Second Empire
French life senators
Grand Officiers of the Légion d'honneur